The Scientology movement has been present in Canada since at least the 1960s. According to the most recent available census data, there were 1,745 individuals in Canada identifying as Scientologists in 2011. The Scientology organisation has encountered difficulties in obtaining status as a tax exempt organization, as has happened in other countries.

Locations 
Scientology has a location in Toronto. In 2015, an application for interior demolition was submitted to the city, and said it planned to renovate it into an Ideal Org. In 2013, Scientology opened a facility in Cambridge, Ontario. In 2015, it was reported that the Toronto property owed over $100,000 in property taxes. In 2017, Scientology announced a plan to move  its Canadian headquarters to Guelph, Ontario. Proximity to Toronto and Cambridge was cited as a reason. Some Guelph residents protested the plan. The facility was opened in the autumn of the year at 40 Baker Street.

Legal status as a religion
Religious scholars David G. Bromley and Douglas Cowan, writing in a 2006 publication, state that Scientology has so far failed to gain official recognition as a religion in Canada.

The Church has failed to win status as a federally registered charity for tax purposes. A November 2007 article in The Varsity, a University of Toronto student newspaper, stated that the Church of Scientology is classified as a religious non-profit organization in Canada whose ministers can perform marriages, and that Scientologist public servants are allowed to take time off work for Scientologist holidays. However, since marriage is governed in Canada by provincial law, it is unclear whether Scientology is actually accredited in any Canadian province to perform legal marriages.

Operation Snow White

"Operation Snow White" was the Church of Scientology's name for a project during the 1970s to purge unfavorable records, mainly in the US, about Scientology and its founder L. Ron Hubbard.

As a result of documents stolen from public and private agencies in Canada and information on other covert activities found as evidence collected in the Operation Snow White case, investigations into the Church of Scientology in Ontario were started. This eventually resulted in a large police raid of the Church of Scientology in Toronto, 3 March to 4 March 1983. The R. v. Church of Scientology of Toronto case began 23 April 1991, resulting in seven members being convicted of operations against organisations including the Ontario Provincial Police, the Ontario Ministry of the Attorney General and the Royal Canadian Mounted Police (RCMP), and two convictions of criminal Breach of the Public Trust against the church itself, for infiltration of the offices of the Ontario Provincial Police and the Ontario Ministry of the Attorney General. The Church of Scientology was ordered to pay a $250,000 fine.

Hill v. Church of Scientology of Toronto

On 17 September 1984, Morris Manning, a lawyer working for the Church, and representatives of the Church of Scientology  held a press conference on the courthouse steps in Toronto. Manning read from and commented upon allegations in a notice of motion by Scientology, intending to commence criminal contempt proceedings against a Crown Attorney, Casey Hill. The motion alleged that Hill had misled a judge and had breached orders sealing certain documents belonging to Scientology in R. v. Church of Scientology of Toronto.

At the contempt proceeding where the appellants were seeking a fine or imprisonment against the defendant, the allegations against Hill were found to be untrue and without foundation. Hill launched a lawsuit for libel damages against the appellants. Both Manning and the Church were found jointly liable for general damages of C$300,000 and Scientology alone was found liable for aggravated damages of C$500,000 and punitive damages of C$800,000. The judgement was affirmed in a 1994 decision by the Court of Appeal for Ontario, and again at the Supreme Court of Canada in 1995.

See also
Religion in Canada

References

External links

Official website: Scientology churches in Canada
Scientology website
Skeptic Tank
The Queen vs. Church of Scientology case

Canada
Religion in Canada